The IWA World Championship is the major title in the Independent Wrestling Association Mid-South based in Louisville, Kentucky. The title debuted at the "Crowning of a Champion" event on April 3, 1997, when Tower of Doom won a twelve man tournament. There have been a total of 122 reigns shared between 60 different champions and 19 vacancies. The current champion is Jake Crist who is in his Third reign.

Title history

Combined reigns

See also
Independent Wrestling Association Mid-South
History of professional wrestling in the United States

References

External links
 IWA Mid-South Heavyweight Title History at Cagematch.net

Heavyweight wrestling championships
IWA Mid-South championships